David Daniels may refer to:
David Daniels (American football) (born 1969), wide receiver for the Seattle Seahawks
David Daniels (basketball) (born 1971), Canadian basketball player
David Daniels (conductor) (born 1933), American conductor
David Daniels (countertenor) (born 1966), American opera singer and countertenor
David Daniels (cricketer) (born 1942), former English cricketer 
David Daniels (filmmaker), American commercial director and filmmaker
David Daniels (poet) (1933–2008), visual poet
David Karsten Daniels (born 1979), American songwriter and musician
David T. Daniels (born 1957), Republican member of the Ohio Senate

See also
David Daniell (disambiguation)